FIDE (Fédération Internationale Des Échecs), or the International Chess Federation

Fide or FIDE may also refer to:
 FIDE (Fédération Internationale pour le Droit Européen), or the International Federation for European Law
 Fide, Gotland, a settlement in Sweden

See also 

 De fide
 Bona fide (disambiguation)
 Fidei (disambiguation)
 Fideism
 Fides (disambiguation)
 
 Fede (disambiguation)